Adams County Airport , also known as Legion Field, is a county-owned public-use airport located in Adams County, Wisconsin, United States. The airport is one nautical mile (1.85 km) east of the village of Friendship and the city of Adams. 
It is included in the Federal Aviation Administration (FAA) National Plan of Integrated Airport Systems for 2021–2025, in which it is categorized as a local general aviation facility.

Facilities and aircraft 

For the 12-month period ending June 28, 2022, the airport had 7,070 aircraft operations, an average of 19 per day: 99% general aviation, 1% air taxi and less than 1% military. In February 2023, there were 12 aircraft based at this airport: all 12 single-engine.

See also
 List of airports in Wisconsin

References

External links 
 

Airports in Wisconsin
Wisconsin
Buildings and structures in Adams County, Wisconsin